In France, a cour d’appel (court of appeal) of the ordre judiciaire (judiciary) is a juridiction de droit commun du second degré, a (court of second-degree common law). It examines judgements, for example from the correctional tribunal or a tribunal de grande instance. When one of the parties is not satisfied with the verdict, it can appeal. While communications from jurisdictions of first instance are termed "judgements", or judgments, a court of appeal renders an arrêt (verdict), which may either uphold or annul the initial judgment. A verdict of the court of appeal may be further appealed en cassation. If the appeal is admissible at the cour de cassation, that court does not re-judge the facts of the matter a third time, but may investigate and verify whether the rules of law were properly applied by the lower courts.

French territories currently contain 36 courts of appeal, of which six are overseas, and a tribunal supérieur d'appel on Saint-Pierre-et-Miquelon.

In France itself, each court governs several départements or similar territories, generally two to four. The courts are often established in the same cities as the former Parlements, the court jurisdictions of the Ancien Régime.

History 
These jurisdictions were created under the name of tribunal d'appel (appeal tribunal) by the loi du 27 ventôse an VIII (law of March 18, 1800), which put an end to the "appel circulaire" which had been put in place in 1790.

The "appeal tribunals" became "courts of appeal" through the sénatus-consulte of 28 floréal an XII (May 18, 1804) and took the name "imperial courts" in 1810. Their name changed afterwards according to the régime: 
 "imperial court" during the First and  Second Empire, 
 "royal court" during the Restoration and the July Monarchy, and
 "court of appeal" during periods of republic, and as they are still known.

Until 1958, appeals of judgments by juges de paix, justices of the peace, and labour courts (de prud'hommes) were brought before the tribunal civil (civil tribunal), while a tribunal d'arrondissement existed for appeals from tribunaux paritaires des baux ruraux and a regional commission of sécurité sociale to appeal the decisions of the first instance. Courts of appeal only recognize, in civil matters, recourse against the judgment of a civil tribunal or a commercial tribunal. In penal matters, courts of appeal accept correctional and police tribunal appeals.

With the reform of 1958, the court of appeal became the only appeal jurisdiction of the judiciary. The exceptions (assizes appeal court, National Court of incapacity and of workplace injury et National court to retain safety) were re-created afterwards.

Organisation 

The magistrates of the court of appeal are generally experienced jurists who began their careers in a first-degree jurisdiction. Each court of appeal is presided over by a "premier président" (also known as the "chef de cour"). The other magistrates du siège are chamber presidents and the counselors, names which recall the parlements of the Ancien Régime. At the court of appeal the vice-présidents and the judges assigned to the first president are affected and can exercise their functions either at the court of appeal or in any related tribunal in that scope. The first president, the chamber presidents and the counselors of the court of appeal are the only magistrates who can preside at assizes courts.

The magistrates of the parquet général are a prosecutor-general (procureur général or chef de parquet), attorneys-general and substituts généraux. Le procureur général oversees the application of criminal law throughout the court of appeal's jurisdiction, within which it assures proper functioning of the parquets. A procureur général or his substitut represent the ministère public before the cour d'assise (Assize Court) sitting at the court of appeal

Each court is structured into a variable number of chambers, several of which may be specialized. A court of appeal at a minimum includes: 
 a correctional appeal chamber,
 a chamber of ''instruction'',
 a chamber for penalty imposition,
 a social chamber,
 a special chamber for minors,
 Other chambers generally include at least one commercial chamber and one civil chamber. 
Courts of appeal include a clerk's office staffed with civil servants.

Judgment formation 
Collegial judgments are composed by three magistrates
 the first president
 a president of chamber 
 and a councillor

(or  president of chamber and two councillors) in the usual formation. The solemn formation consists of five magistrates and is notably used n cases sent back down from the court of cassation
In rare cases, the court of appeal meets in the form of an "assembly of chambers" which comprises the magistrates of two chambers (three for the Paris Court of Appeals).

Attributions

Jurisdictional attributions 

The court of appeal recognizes appeals of matters previously brought before the relevant tribunals, (du ressort), both civil and penal:
 tribunal d'instance
 police tribunals
 tribunal de grande instance
 juge d'instruction
 judge of freedoms and of detention
 correctional tribunal
 judge of penalty imposition
 commercial tribunal
 labour council
 joint agricultural land tribunal
 Social security tribunal
It is also the venue for recourse against bar association elections and some bar association decisions, as well as the decisions of other professional associations (ordres professionnels) of the French legal system.

The Court of Appeal of Paris is competent to hear matters of recourse against the decisions of certain independent administrative regulation authorities (Autorité de la concurrence, Autorité des marchés financiers, Autorité de régulation des communications électroniques, des postes et de la distribution de la presse...).

In the court of assizes, since the 2000 law on the presumption of innocence, an assize appeal court is not a second degree court but a different assize, in another département and with nine jurors instead of six.

Not all matters can be appealed and thus some cannot be re-judged on appeal, for example the least important litigation. In this case the pourvoi en cassation remains possible.

Administrative assignments 
The first president of the court of appeal and the prosecutor general, possibly assisted by other magistrates, participate in the administration and the inspection of the jurisdictions in the court's responsibility. They therefore have a qualité d'ordonnateur and are responsible for public markets. They are assisted, in these assignments, by the regional administrative service.

List of appeal courts and their purviews

See also 
 Judiciary of France
 Cour d'assises
 Police Court (France)
 Tribunal correctionnel (France)
 Ministère public (France) - has some but not all characteristics of a prosecutor in common law jurisdictions
 Court of Appeal or Cour d'appel redirect to Appellate court, which deal with common law appeal jurisdictions, which differ considerably from French appeal procedures
 Court of Cassation (France)
 Court of Cassation - deals with common-law jurisdictions, which differ considerably from French appeal procedures

References 

Judiciary of France
Courts in France
1800 establishments in France
Courts and tribunals established in 1800